Sib and Suran County is in Sistan and Baluchestan province, Iran. The capital of the county is the city of Suran. At the 2006 census, the region's population (as Hiduj District and Sib and Suran District of Saravan County) was 60,784 in 12,663 households. The following census in 2011 counted 73,189 people in 17,445 households, by which time the two districts had been separated from the county to form Sib and Suran County. At the 2016 census, the county's population was 85,095 in 21,665 households.

Administrative divisions

The population history and structural changes of Sib and Suran County's administrative divisions over three consecutive censuses are shown in the following table. The latest census shows two districts, four rural districts, and two cities.

References

 

Counties of Sistan and Baluchestan Province